The Lucha Libre World Cup was a two-day professional wrestling event and tournament  organized by Mexican professional wrestling promotion Lucha Libre AAA Worldwide (AAA) with the financial backing of the Grupo Modelo brewery, with Victoria Beer as the official sponsor. The tournament took place on October 9 and October 10 in Tokyo's Shin-Kiba 1st Ring and Korakuen Hall venues, marking the first time the tournament has been held outside AAA's home country of Mexico. The 2017 edition of the tournament also marked the first to feature traditional two-man tag teams, as the previous tournaments had featured a number of three-man tag teams, referred to as trios in Lucha Libre. The tournament showcased teams representing numerous international promotions such as the Inoki Genome Federation (IGF), Impact Wrestling, and Pro Wrestling Noah among others.

Background
The Mexican lucha libre promotion AAA, with the financial support of the Mexican brewing company Grupo Modelo organized the first ever Lucha Libre World Cup in the summer of 2015. The tournament itself was a one-night eight-team tournament for trios, or tag teams of three wrestlers. AAA reached out to several promotions both in Mexico and around the world and arranged for six of the eight teams to come from outside AAA. Japanese wrestling promotions All Japan Pro Wrestling (AJPW) and Pro Wrestling Noah both sent teams. Both Total Nonstop Action Wrestling (TNA) and Ring of Honor (ROH), based in the United States, also sent representatives to the tournament, in each case bolstered by representatives of Lucha Underground, an AAA joint-venture project based on Los Angeles. The tournament took place on May 25, 2015, and had the AAA labelled "Dream Team" of Rey Mysterio Jr., El Patrón Alberto and Myzteziz win the tournament, defeating Team TNA/Lucha Underground (Matt Hardy, Mr. Anderson and Johnny Mundo) in the finals. A second World Cup was held in the summer of 2016. The second edition featured two tournaments, one for male wrestlers and another for female wrestlers. The men's tournament was won by Brian Cage, Chavo Guerrero Jr., and Johnny Mundo of Team Lucha Underground while the women's tournament was won by Faby Apache, Lady Apache, and Mari Apache of Team Mexico.

AAA officially announced the 2017 tournament and the participating teams on September 29.

Teams

Results

October 9

October 10

Tournament bracket

See also

2017 in professional wrestling

References

External links
AAA's official Japanese-language Twitter account
Official Twitter account
Official Facebook page

2017 in professional wrestling
2017
2017 in Tokyo
Events in Tokyo
Professional wrestling in Tokyo
October 2017 events in Japan
Pro Wrestling Noah shows
Lucha Underground shows
Impact Wrestling shows